Papilionanthe hookeriana, also known as anggrek pensil in indonesian, or kinta weed, is a species of orchid native to the swamps of Borneo, Malaya, Sumatera, Thailand, and Vietnam.

Description 
The peduncle of the inflorescence is longer than the leaves of the plant.

Distribution 
The species is native to Vietnam, Malaysia, Indonesia and Thailand.

Habitat 
This species is terrestrial or semi-aquatic, as opposed to many other orchid species that are epiphytic. It grows in full sun in swamps near sea level. The plants should be flooded during the growing season. These freshwater swamp forests may grow along the edges of lakes. The soil can be very acidic, with pH values ranging between 4 and 5.

Conservation 
These habitats are threatened from logging, fire and land conversion.  Therefore, this species has been declining in Indonesia since the early 1990s. A program of the University of Riau made a restoration effort, re-planting artificially multiplied plants back into their intended habitat in 2007 and 2008.  Further studies on micropropagation and acclimatisation of plantlets have been undertaken.

Use in hybridisation 
It is the pollen parent of the hybrid Papilionanthe Miss Joaquim, which was originally hybridised by Agnes Joaquim.

References

hookeriana
Flora of Vietnam
Flora of Peninsular Malaysia
Flora of Borneo
Flora of Sumatra
Flora of Thailand
Orchids of Malaysia
Orchids of Indonesia